Franklin Townsend (1821–1898) was descended from Henry Townsend, one of the founders of Oyster Bay, New York. He was a 19th-century industrialist, active in his family's iron business which was a branch of the Stirling Iron Works, the maker of the Hudson River Chain that prevented the British Royal Navy from sailing up the Hudson River during the American Revolutionary War. He was active in Albany politics, serving as an alderman and one term as mayor. He also served as Adjutant General of New York from 1869 to 1873.

Biography

Birth and family
General Franklin Townsend was born on September 28, 1821 to Isaiah and Hannah Townsend Townsend in Albany New York. Franklin's brothers were Howard Townsend, a prominent doctor; Frederick Townsend, a Union officer in the American Civil War; and Robert Townsend, a ship's commander in the American Civil War who lost his life while on duty in China. Townsend's maternal grandfather was Solomon Townsend, a midshipman in the Colonial United States Navy, merchant ship captain, and active in the iron business in New York State through the Augusta Forge which he established in Tuxedo, New York. It could be said that iron ran in the family's blood since Townsend's great uncle, Peter Townsend, established and ran the Stirling Iron Works which forged the great Hudson River Chain which was strung across the Hudson River just south of the important American base at West Point, New York.

On January 15, 1852 Franklin Townsend married Anna Josephine King, the daughter of Rufus H. King, a U.S. Representative from New York, and Amelia Laverty King, in Albany. They had two children:
Rufus King Townsend (born in Albany New York March 18, 1853; died there December 21, 1895), who was educated at The Albany Academy and at Williams College and eventually headed his father's iron business.
Franklin Townsend, Jr. (born in Albany on November 4, 1854; died there on October 31, 1895), who was educated at The Albany Academy and Williams College and studied at the College of Physicians and Surgeons in New York City. After graduation he received practical medical training in Germany and built his career practicing medicine in Albany where he was highly respected.

Iron business
Franklin Townsend's father, Isaiah established his own metals business in partnership with his brother John 1804 called "I & J Townsend" The firm was involved in the buying and selling of iron and produced in their foundry machine castings and railcar wheels. Franklin joined the business as a young man in 1849 upon the death of his uncle John Townsend along with John's son Theodore, (Franklin's first cousin). In 1856 he changed the business to a sole proprietor by the name of "Franklin Townsend & Co." until 1871 when his older son Rufus King Townsend succeeded him.

Military career

When civil war broke out in the United States, Townsend became involved in raising the One Hundred and Thirteenth Regiment which in December 1862 was converted to the Seventh Heavy Artillery. Recruitment lasted from July 24, 1862 to August 18 and raised 1,100 men. The regiment left Albany the next day bound for Washington.

Townsend was appointed Adjutant General of New York for five years January 1, 1869 to 1873.

Political career
Townsend was active in Albany city politics, serving as a supervisor and alderman. On April 9, 1850, he was elected as a Whig the 47th Mayor of Albany, following in the footsteps of his uncle John Townsend, the 37th Mayor of Albany. Franklin Townsend was a Democratic member of the New York State Assembly (Albany Co., 4th D.) in 1857.

Commercial interests
In addition to his involvement in the family's iron business, Townsend was president of the New York State National Bank 1867 to 1879 and vice president of the Albany Savings Bank.

Death
Franklin Townsend died at his home at 4 Elk Street, Albany NY on September 11, 1898. His body is interred at the Albany Rural Cemetery in Albany.

References

1821 births
1898 deaths
Townsend family
Mayors of Albany, New York
National Guard (United States) generals
American people of English descent
Burials at Albany Rural Cemetery
People from Tuxedo, New York
Adjutants General of New York (state)
19th-century American politicians